Heyburn is a city in Minidoka County, Idaho, United States. The population was 3,700 at the 2020 census, up from 3,089 in 2010. It is part of the Burley micropolitan area.

The city was named after Weldon B. Heyburn, a U.S. senator for Idaho from 1903 to 1912.

Geography

Heyburn sits on the southern edge of Minidoka County, bounded to the south by the Snake River, which forms the Cassia County line. The city of Burley borders Heyburn to the south and west. Interstate 84 passes through the north side of the city, with access from Exits 208 and 211. I-84 leads west  to the Twin Falls area and southeast  to Ogden, Utah. U.S. Route 30 passes through the southeast part of Heyburn running from Exit 211 of I-84 southwest across the Snake River into Burley. Idaho State Highway 27 passes through the west side of Heyburn, connecting Burley to the south with Paul  to the north.

Demographics

2010 census
As of the census of 2010, there were 3,089 people, 1,109 households, and 830 families residing in the city. The racial makeup of the city was 77.4% White, 0.6% African American, 2.3% Native American, 0.6% Asian, 16.6% from other races, and 2.6% from two or more races. Hispanic or Latino of any race were 32.5% of the population.

There were 1,109 households, of which 38.5% had children under the age of 18 living with them, 58.3% were married couples living together, 10.6% had a female householder with no husband present, 6.0% had a male householder with no wife present, and 25.2% were non-families. 21.9% of all households were made up of individuals, and 7.9% had someone living alone who was 65 years of age or older. The average household size was 2.79 and the average family size was 3.26.

The median age in the city was 32.8 years. 29.8% of residents were under the age of 18; 8.9% were between the ages of 18 and 24; 24.1% were from 25 to 44; 23.6% were from 45 to 64; and 13.6% were 65 years of age or older. The gender makeup of the city was 50.4% male and 49.6% female.

2000 census
As of the census of 2000, there were 2,899 people, 1,002 households, and 787 families residing in the city. The racial makeup of the city was 74.92% White, 0.17% African American, 1.10% Native American, 0.52% Asian, 0.07% Pacific Islander, 20.08% from other races, and 3.14% from two or more races. Hispanic or Latino of any race were 28.39% of the population.

There were 1,002 households, out of which 41.5% had children under the age of 18 living with them, 62.6% were married couples living together, 11.7% had a female householder with no husband present, and 21.4% were non-families. 18.5% of all households were made up of individuals, and 6.7% had someone living alone who was 65 years of age or older. The average household size was 2.89 and the average family size was 3.28.

In the city, the population was spread out, with 32.5% under the age of 18, 10.0% from 18 to 24, 26.0% from 25 to 44, 22.2% from 45 to 64, and 9.2% who were 65 years of age or older. The median age was 31 years. For every 100 females, there were 97.2 males. For every 100 females age 18 and over, there were 95.4 males.

The median income for a household in the city was $31,685, and the median income for a family was $37,663. Males had a median income of $28,226 versus $20,951 for females. The per capita income for the city was $12,591. About 13.0% of families and 17.0% of the population were below the poverty line, including 20.1% of those under age 18 and 8.1% of those age 65 or over.

Economy
Heyburn's economy is largely influenced by its proximity to the city of Twin Falls. The region's prominent agricultural and distribution sector saw a huge boost in 2012 when Chobani opened the world's largest yogurt processing facility in nearby Twin Falls. The plant represents an investment of $450 million and employs over 1,000 people. Heyburn has recently become home to a Gem State Processing potato plant and the Double L harvest equipment manufacturer. Additionally, companies such the Packaging Corporation of America have seen employment rise as new businesses seek out their services.

Education
Heyburn is served by the Minidoka County Schools system.

Children are zoned to:
 Heyburn Elementary School (Heyburn)
 West Minico Middle School (Unincorporated Minidoka County)
 Minico High School (Unincorporated Minidoka County)
 Mt. Harrison High School (Heyburn: grades 9–12, alternative high school)

See also

 List of cities in Idaho

References

External links

 

Cities in Idaho
Cities in Minidoka County, Idaho
Burley, Idaho micropolitan area